Arkhoti Valley, Arkhvati Gorge (Georgian: არხოტის ხეობა) is a valley in Georgia, in the Dusheti municipality of the Mtskheta-Mtianeti region, inside the historical region of Khevsureti. It is one of the most isolated regions of Georgia.

Description of the region 
The village  on the left bank of the river Chimghistskali has become depopulated.

In the Arkhoti Valley there are still the remains of the following villages and towns: Kalotana, Ghorghu, Tskhsua, Kviritsminda.

There are also places of the following name: Bisna in the Bisna Valley and Kovgra in the Taniestskali Gorge.

The Arkhoti Valley is a border region and is bordered by Russia to the north.

Monuments 

These are some of the cult buildings of the Arkhoti Valley: Svetiangelozisljvari, Tskalshuisjvari, Tchishvelisjvari, Arkhotisjvari, Laghi Iakhsari, Sabekuri, Rkenisjvari, Saneba Tskalsshuas Meburtvali, Sanebakaris Mezobeli, Mariamtsminda, Peter Oreti, Petre Zetukis Tsverisa, Sabalakhis Tsveri

Roads 
The main and shortest way to the neighboring Kist people is the road that follows river Assa. The distance from the remote village of the community - to the nearest settlements of Amga-Ingushetia - Pui, which the people of Arkhot call Gostikakauri, is 18-20 km.

Road construction was finished only by 2018.

See also 
Khevsureti

References 

Mtskheta-Mtianeti
Valleys of Georgia (country)